Betulia can refer to:
 The biblical city of Bethulia, alias Betuloua
 Betulia, Antioquia in Colombia
 Betulia, Santander in Colombia
 1580 Betulia (provisional designation: 1950 KA), an Amor asteroid discovered on May 22, 1950
 The opera by Pietro Metastasio (see also Mozart's Oratorio Betulia Liberata, K. 118 - 74c)

See also
 Betula
 Betuliad